Emem may refer to:

Emem language

Emem may also refer to:

People
Emem Eduok
Emem Isong
Emem Edem

See also
EMEM